Oropos was an ancient Greek (i.e., pre-Hellenistic) walled settlement located in the region of Epirus. The settlement site is in modern-day Voulista Panaghia.

See also
List of cities in ancient Epirus

References

Sources

Cities in ancient Epirus
Populated places in ancient Epirus
Former populated places in Greece